Moyie may refer to
 Moyie, British Columbia, a town in Canada
 Moyie Springs, Idaho a town in the United States
 Moyie (sternwheeler), an 1898 paddle steamer
 Moyie Lake, a lake in British Columbia
 Moyie River, a river in British Columbia and Idaho